Merritt Todd Cooke (October 17, 1846 – July 12, 1922) was an American politician. A native of Norfolk, he represented the city in the Virginia House of Delegates.

References

External links 

1846 births
1922 deaths
Democratic Party members of the Virginia House of Delegates
19th-century American politicians
20th-century American politicians